This is the list of the 18 members of the European Parliament for Austria in the 2004 to 2009 session.

List

Notes

Sources
 Ministry of the Interior (in German)

2004
Austria
List